Admiral Sir Gervase Alard, Bart. (1270–1340), was an English knight and naval commander who was appointed Admiral of the Cinque Ports Fleet and Admiral of the Western Fleet of the English Navy who served under King's Edward I, Edward II and Edward III of England from 1296 to 1340.

He is known as the first serving naval officer to be granted a commission to the rank of Admiral of an English fleet in 1303.

Naval career
Geravse Alard was born in Winchelsea, East Sussex, England in 1270 and came from a seafaring family and was deemed a master mariner he served as a knight of King Edward I. In 1294 he was appointed as the first Mayor of Winchelsea. His first service in the navy came when he took part in Edward I naval campaigns in Scotland from (1300-1306).

On 25 September 1300 Alard was first appointed as an Admiral of the Cinque Ports by Edward I of England confirmed by a royal writ that outlined the position as an administrative office until 3 February 1303. On 4 February 1303 he became the first serving English naval officer to be granted a royal commission to the rank of Admiral of an English Fleet and appointed Captain and Admiral of the Fleet of the Cinque Ports. he remained in command of the Cinque Ports fleet until 1304. Additionally he was also appointed Admiral of the Irish Sea in 1304 a post he held until 1305.

In July 1306 he was granted two further commissions and appointed Admiral of the Western Fleet and re-appointed Admiral of the Cinque Ports  he held both offices simultaneously until 1314.

Family
Gervase Alard is thought to be the son of Thomas Alard when he was granted the town of New Winchelsea for life by the King in November 1306 in succession to him. In addition he was father to Stephen Alard, who later became Admiral of the Cinque Ports and the Western Fleet.

Footnotes

Bibliography
 Archives, National. (1306). "Edward I to Gervase Alard, admiral, and the barons of the Cinque Ports serving in the fleet: thanks for their good service, which he asks them to continue. Dated at Blenkinsop. Privy Seal. Draft". www.nationalarchives.gov.uk. Kew, England: The National Archives UK.
 Carruthers, Bob (2013). Medieval Warfare. Barnsley, England: Pen and Sword. p. 84. .
 Harris, Sir Nicholas (1847). A History of the Royal Navy: From the Earliest Times to the Wars of the French Revolution, Volume 1. London: R. Bentley. 
 Prestwich, Michael (1988). Edward I. Berkeley, United States: University of California Press. .
 Pryde, E. B.; Greenway, D. E.; Porter, S.; Roy, I. (1996). Handbook of British Chronology. Cambridge, England: Cambridge University Press. p. 134. .
 Rodger, N.A.M. (1997). "Appendix V:Admirals and Officials: English Admirals 1295 to 1408.". The safeguard of the sea : a naval history of Britain. Vol 1., 660–1649. London: Penguin. .
 Rose, Susan (2013). England's Medieval Navy 1066-1509: Ships, Men & Warfare. Barnsley, England: Seaforth Publishing. .
 Spence, Keith (1999). The Companion Guide to Kent and Sussex. Boydell & Brewer Ltd. .
 Watson, Fiona James (1991). "Edward I in Scotland 1296 to 1305: Theses submitted for the Degree of Ph.D" (PDF). www.theses.gla.ac.uk. University of Glasgow.

1270 births
1340 deaths
13th-century English Navy personnel
14th-century English Navy personnel
English admirals
People from Winchelsea
Military personnel from Sussex